Miracle Workers is an American reality television show that aired for one season produced by Jim Hunziker and Gary Shaffer for ABC in 2006. The show features seriously ill people who were unable to afford treatment; the show covered all medical costs, and also documents the results of the treatment.

The show follows the main cast of Drs. Redmond Burke and Billy Cohn along with nurses Janna Bullock and Tamara Houston as they interact with and perform the treatment on different patients every episode.

Production 
Produced and aired on ABC, Miracle Workers first premiered on 6 March 2006. The show was set in the United States, with the opening instalment being set at the Cincinnati Eye Institute and Christus St. Joseph Hospital in Houston.

Drs. Redmonde Burke, chief of pediatric cardiovascular at The Congenital Heart Institute at Miami Children’s Hospital and Arnold Palmer Hospital in Florida, and Billy Cohn were already working together before they signed onto “Miracle Workers” as the two main doctors. The show made use of the newest technology along with Burke and Cohn’s professional knowledge to help various patients with their medical conditions.

Each episode is structured in a format where two patients suffering from unique debilitating medical problems are introduced to the viewers. Before getting into the actual treatment and surgery for these patients, “Miracle Workers” provide insight into what the actual conditions are along with how this has impacted the patients’ lives. Afterwards, the surgery process is shown along with the use of special effects to show inside the patient’s bodies and then the result of the surgery.

The cost of the treatments are covered by ABC and CVS pharmacy and the patients who appear on the show are people who have not been able to receive treatment from the US medical system, either due to financial hardship or due to the high costs of surgery for their particular condition.

Synopsis

Reception
The New York Times gave the show a rating of 5/10 with the positives being that the show is more of a documentary than reality television, which educates viewers on particular conditions and modern interventions. The review also talks about how the show doesn’t explicitly inform viewers on who funds the treatments and how much the actual costs are. Furthermore, it briefly talks about how the show may be hard to watch for those who are squeamish.

Advocacy organization Common Sense Media rated it 4/5, finding that surgical scenes and medical jargon might be unsuitable for small children, while calling it "heart-warming".

The Chicago Tribune gave the show a rating of 7/10 saying that the show is not as graphic compared to other shows in the same genre. The review goes on to say that the stories told on the series are touching whilst also updating the general audience on how medical technology has evolved.

Intersect mentions how medical reality TV programs have raised awareness of unfamiliar illnesses among the greater community who may have not known the conditions or the impact of them on patients’ lives. The show has also been praised for contributing and showing what kinds of new medical interventions are possible.

Controversy 
“Miracle Workers” has been at the centre of controversy for a variety of reasons, for seemingly supporting ableist culture, commodifying illnesses and the use of methods which are underdeveloped and not necessarily guaranteed to be safe.

Supporting Ableist Culture 
Disability Studies Quarterly said that the show presents illness and disabilities in a way that supports ableist culture, that life with the conditions that these patients go through can never be as fulfilling or even worth living.

Commodification of Illness 
The show has also been questioned about whether the patients’ medical conditions are being exploited for viewership and revenue whilst depicting the positive results of people who appear on the show while ignoring the suffering of many others who cannot afford treatment. Intersect further adds how U.S. medical reality tv shows like “Miracle Workers” Commodify illness by exposing a vulnerability of someone to the general public for the sake of entertainment and profit.

Use of experimental procedures 
The show has also drawn controversy for its use of new but underdeveloped technology on the patients. The procedures were deemed risky according to Disability Studies Quarterly and questions on whether the lower success rate of the show might have led to only the successful procedures being aired. British Medical Journal adds that although the treatments and procedures used in the show are approved, some of these methods might not be covered under US health insurance companies due to how new and experimental they are.

Influence on patient-provider relations 
According to a research on patient-provider communication, the perspective that medical reality television could have an influence on how the public expect healthcare providers’ communication and procedures to go has been brought forward. Evidence suggests that television programs that portray doctor and patient interactions could lead to viewers having elevated expectations, especially if medical television is the only source of information for certain audiences.

Furthermore, the aforementioned article journal brings up the question of representation on medical reality shows when it comes to race, ethnicity and gender. More specifically, it talks about the lack of the portrayal of women doctors/physicians and minority races.

Airing after the death of a patient 
Questions and concerns occurred amongst viewers about whether it was ethical to broadcast the episode of Priscilla Benoit, days after her death. Robert Thompson raises the question of whether airing the episode was "unseemly to do".

Positive Impacts 
BMC Medical Education states that medical reality tv can provide real-life examples of patient care along with technology enhanced strategies. According to the source, a programme of learning was developed using clips from medical reality television such as 24 hours in A&E to provide a mode of case-based learning. Students in this study reacted positively to the use medical reality tv as a realistic and relatable method of teaching along with finding this method of teaching further engaging and memorable, most likely due to the high degree of emotions portrayed throughout.

A review on Miracle Workers by the British Medical Journal talks about how despite the difficulty of getting on the show in the first place and having treatment fully funded through the show, this series has successfully treated the patients who have appeared on the show. The beneficial effects of the treatments carried out on Miracle Workers along with the solution of the illnesses the patients suffer from are shown at the end of each episode.

Aftermath 
Priscilla Benoit who appeared on episode 5 of the series, passed away at age 56 at the Texas Heart Institute, which is a part of Luke's Episcopal Hospital in Houston after suffering from numerous side effects such as a stroke, pneumonia, sepsis and brain haemorrhage. The episode with Benoit was still aired as the executive producers of the series felt a responsibility to portray Benoit's journey along with Dr. Cohn agreeing with the decision to air the episode.

References

Additional references
Felicia R. Lee. "Raising Reality-TV Stakes, Show Plans to Offer Medical 'Miracles'." New York Times Published: January 17, 2006
Heart patient from ‘Miracle Workers’ dies, Today, Mar 30, 2006

2000s American reality television series
American Broadcasting Company original programming
2006 American television series debuts
2006 American television series endings
English-language television shows
Television series by DreamWorks Television
2000s American medical television series